Malvaloca is a 1942 Spanish drama film directed by Luis Marquina and starring Amparo Rivelles, Alfredo Mayo and Manuel Luna. It is an adaptation of the 1912 play of the same title about a fallen woman from Málaga who eventually redeems herself. Following the film's success Rivelles was signed up on a lucrative three-year contract by CIFESA, the biggest studio in Spain.

Synopsis 
A beautiful and nice young woman from Malaga, whom everyone calls Malvaloca, is forced to have lovers to bring money to her house, when she falls in love with Leonardo, a friend and partner of her last lover. The drama is unleashed because although he also loves her, they must fight against the social rejection that this courtship provokes. Apart from the dramatic action, the work shows the grace and spontaneity of the dialogues typical of the works of the Quinteros brothers.

Cast
 Amparo Rivelles as Malvaloca
 Alfredo Mayo as Leonardo 
 Manuel Luna as Salvador 
 Rosita Yarza as Juanela  
 Fernando Freyre de Andrade as Jeromo 
 Miguel Pozanco as Barrabás 
 Rafaela Satorrés as Hermana Piedad 
 Pablo Hidalgo as Nogales 
 María López Morante as Teresona 
 Mercedes Borrull as Alfonsa 
 José Prada as Padre de Malvaloca 
 Matilde Artero as Doña Enriqueta 
 Camino Garrigó as Mariquita 
 Nicolás D. Perchicot as Martín 
 Angelita Navalón   
 Gracia de Triana

References

Bibliography
 Labanyi, Jo & Pavlović, Tatjana. A Companion to Spanish Cinema. John Wiley & Sons, 2012.
 Peiró, Eva Woods. White Gypsies: Race and Stardom in Spanish Musical Films. University of Minnesota Press, 2012.

External links 

1942 films
1942 drama films
Spanish drama films
1940s Spanish-language films
Spanish films based on plays
Films directed by Luis Marquina
Films set in Málaga
Spanish black-and-white films
1940s Spanish films